Space Museum was a science fiction comics series published by National Comics (now DC Comics) in their flagship science fiction title Strange Adventures between 1959 and 1964. The series was written by Gardner Fox and was drawn by Carmine Infantino for almost the whole series.

Publication history
Space Museum first appeared in the story "The World of Doomed Spacemen" in Strange Adventures #104 (May 1959), written by creator Gardner Fox under the editorship of Julius Schwartz. The series of 8-page stories was published in rotation with two others, The Atomic Knights and Star Hawkins, and appeared in every third issue of Strange Adventures from #106 - 157 (July 1959 - October 1963), with one last story, "Space Museum of the Dead World", in issue #161 (February 1964) - a total of 20 stories. With the exception of the first tale, which was drawn by Mike Sekowsky and Bernard Sachs, all the other Space Museum stories were drawn by Carmine Infantino. Only the initial story featured on the cover of Strange Adventures.

Story Listing

Issue           Title

 104		WORLD OF DOOMED SPACEMEN
 106		SECRET OF THE SPACE JEWEL
 109		SECRET OF THE TICK-TOCK WORLD
 112		REVOLT OF THE SPACESHIPS
 115		THE GEM INVASION OF EARTH
 118		THREAT OF THE PLANET WRECKERS
 121		THE BILLION-YEAR OLD SPACESHIP
 124		EARTH VICTORY- BY A HAIR
 127		SON OF TWO WORLDS
 130		THE TOY SOLDIER WAR
 133		THE IMMORTAL SPACEMAN!
 136		SECOND-BEST SPACEMAN!
 139		SECRET OF THE ENERGY WEAPON!
 142		PRISONER OF THE SPACE FLOWERS
 145		THE MASS ENERGY ROBBERS OF SPACE
 148		THE EVOLUTIONARY ENSIGN OF SPACE
 151		THE TREE OF 1000 COLORS!
 154		ESCAPE-ARTIST OF SPACE!
 157		RESCUE BY MOONLIGHT
 161		SPACE MUSEUM OF THE DEAD WORLD

The first three Space Museum stories were reprinted in the DC Comics science fiction reprint anthology, From Beyond the Unknown #23 -25 (July/August 1973 - November/December 1973), but the title was then cancelled. Eighteen years later writer Gerry Conway re-introduced the Space Museum concept in "The Secret that Time Forgot" in Justice League of America #206 (September 1982), and in 1984 writer Paul Kupperberg followed in The New Adventures of Superboy #50 (February 1984), this in a 30th-century Legion of Superheroes framing sequence by Keith Giffen around a modern-day Superboy story by Kurt Schaffenberger. Two years later Dan Jurgens returned to the original 25th century Space Museum for the location of Booster Gold's origin story. With the exception of the retrospective origin story of the Museum, "The Startling Secret of The Space Museum" in Secret Origins #50 (August 1990) by editor Mark Waid and Gerard Jones (with Carmine Infantino again returning to the artwork), and two stories set in the Museum - "When Robots Attack" in Legionnaires #68 (Feb 1999) by Roger Stern and Tom McGraw, and Booster Gold #0 (April 2008) - the few other references since have all been in retellings of or allusions to Booster Gold's origin.

Fictional history

Strange Adventures - 1959 - 1964
Space Museum in Strange Adventures was an anthology series set in the 25th century featuring mainly unlinked heroic tales of outer space adventure; with a regular framing sequence that opens and closes each episode with the only continuing characters - Howard Parker and his young son Tommy (and on three occasions his mother) making their monthly visit to the Space Museum, later established as being in Metropolis. It is a museum dedicated to showcasing the history of five centuries of human space travel, and features many exhibits in transparent display cases, each artifact from an adventure an Earth space traveller had had in outer space. The objects in the display cases are often ordinary, although somehow they were used to either save the Earth or some other planet from disaster: Behind every object in the Space Museum there's a tale of heroism, daring, self sacrifice. During these visits Tommy always asks his father about one exhibit in particular, and Howard Parker then tells his son the story behind that exhibit, including:
 a pair of contact lenses that deflected an aliens' attempt at manipulating brain waves;
 a pocket watch that saved a planet by preventing magnetic storms from destroying it;
 a gold medal and a spaceship called Ike (the only time a story features two artifacts in the Museum);
 a stuffed magpie called Tommy (after which Tommy Parker was named) that saved the Earth from an invasion of deadly jewels;
 an invisible being of pure energy;
 one of Tommy's mother's blonde hairs, in a story which reveals that she was Admiral Ann 'Blondy' Gordon of the Space Marines and his father General 'Wrecker' Parker;
 a toy soldier that helped defeat an alien invasion;
 a search for the Fountain of Youth;
 a race against time to save the Universe;
 a man who discovered he could turn anything into a weapon;
 a picture of Tommy, who had rescued his parents from aliens at the age of three;
 a knitting needle used by Tommy's mother, then Ensign Gordon, to save Earth from aliens;
 an alien woman who appears in the Museum every few years in thanks for being saved by Alan Strange, a descendant of Adam Strange and his wife Alanna.

Only one tale does not fit into the normal narrative sequence, when Tommy and two of his friends in the Interplanetary Boy Scouts, using the skills Tommy has learned from the heroic stories he has been told, rescue Earth from aliens bent on stealing all its energy, and also rescue the Space Museum, which has been stolen by them.

Later appearances
It is eventually revealed that the founding of the Space Museum, on the site of an old Military Surplus warehouse where hundreds of years worth of space history has piled up, came about because Tommy's father was a Space Marine guard there, and he "liberated" some of the mementos, keeping them in his military footlocker. Because of his knowledge of space history, Tommy's father recognizes aliens who had attacked Earth before trying again (by pretending to be scrap dealers and taking the artifacts from the warehouse to use as weapons against humanity). He is able to use the objects he has saved to stop the aliens, although demolishing the warehouse at the same time. His earlier wish ("People in my time have become jaded, bored with space travel. If only they were exposed to the heroism of Earth's star-spanning pioneers, their sense of adventure might be awakened") is fulfilled when the military realize the value of "historical consciousness" and create the Space Museum on the site.

The Space Museum also figures prominently in the origin of the superhero Booster Gold. In 2462 Michael Carter, a disgraced ex-football player is working as a night watchman in the Museum, and studies the history. He deactivates and steals Skeets, a robot Museum guard with an encyclopedic knowledge of 20th century Earth history, together with an alien power suit, some power gloves and control bands, mystic power rods, a Legion Flight Ring, a force field belt, a credit card and other unspecified items from the displays, and escapes in Rip Hunter's Time Sphere, a time travel device from the 1960s, to journey back to the 1980s, become a superhero, and get rich and famous on the franchising opportunities.

As an adult Tommy Parker took his own son Gardner to the Museum and told him a story of the exhibits, something he had hoped for years before. At some later point Ultra the Multi-Alien is known to have searched for the cosmic staff of Prince Gavin, Starman, as an artifact for the Museum.

By 2984 the Space Museum has been renamed The Museum of Heroes and Legends, and has a whole wing dedicated to The Legion of Superheroes, as well as one to Earth's historical superheroes. That year one of the Dial H for Hero H-Dials is stolen from the museum by a petty crook while Chameleon Boy is attending a ceremony there. The villain escapes to 1984 with the help of the Dial, which is ripped to pieces by Krypto the Superdog before eventually being returned to the Museum in pieces by Chameleon Boy, where the Curator reveals they have another one. The Museum appears to have been renamed the Time and History Museum some time later, and it is partly demolished by Xotar the Conqueror, a minor Justice League of America foe, on a mission to conquer the 30th century.

Other versions
In the non-continuity series Twilight by Howard Chaykin, in the 22nd century Karel Sorensen of the Star Rovers creates a Church in her name and headquarters it at the Space Museum.

References

 "A Series of Strange Adventures", by DC Comics Editor Jack C. Harris, The Amazing World of DC Comics, #12 (July 1976) (DC Comics) (note: issue says August 1976 on cover, but July 1976 in indicia).
 "A visit to the Space Museum" by Gleeson, Tony - article in Comic Book Marketplace #75 (Gemstone Publishing, January 2000).
 Space Museum entry in "The Silver Age Companion" by Barr, Michael (TwoMorrows Publishing, 2007)

External links
 Space Museum information at Adam Arnold's Vanishing Point - http://www.adamarnold.net/riphunter/whoswhospacemuseum.html

DC Comics titles
1959 comics debuts
1964 comics endings
Fictional museums
Science fiction comics
DC Comics locations